Ashland is a city in and the county seat of Clark County, Kansas, United States.  As of the 2020 census, the population of the city was 783.

History
Ashland lies along what was once a military road from Fort Dodge (now Dodge City, Kansas) to the north and Fort Supply in the Indian Territory to the south.  In 1870, during the Comanche Campaign against the Native Americans, the Army built two redoubts along the Dodge/Supply trail near the current site of Ashland: the Bear Creek Redoubt, five miles to the north, and the Cimarron Redoubt, nine miles to the south.

Founded in 1884, it was named after the city of Ashland, Kentucky. The first post office in Ashland was established in 1885.

Geography

Climate

Demographics

In 2000, the median income for a household in the city was $32,721, and the median income for a family was $40,682. Males had a median income of $25,000 versus $20,313 for females. The per capita income for the city was $18,183. About 9.5% of families and 11.6% of the population were below the poverty line, including 19.3% of those under age 18 and 7.9% of those age 65 or over.

2010 census
As of the census of 2010, there were 867 people, 381 households, and 239 families residing in the city. The racial makeup of the city was 92.7% White, 0.9% Native American, 0.5% Asian, 0.1% Pacific Islander, 2.3% from other races, and 3.5% from two or more races. Hispanic or Latino of any race were 8.8% of the population.

There were 381 households, of which 27.6% had children under the age of 18 living with them, 49.6% were married couples living together, 9.2% had a female householder with no husband present, 3.9% had a male householder with no wife present, and 37.3% were non-families. 33.9% of all households were made up of individuals, and 17.3% had someone living alone who was 65 years of age or older. The average household size was 2.22 and the average family size was 2.81.

The median age in the city was 44.8 years. 23.9% of residents were under the age of 18; 5.4% were between the ages of 18 and 24; 21.2% were from 25 to 44; 28% were from 45 to 64; and 21.7% were 65 years of age or older. The gender makeup of the city was 48.6% male and 51.4% female.

Arts and culture
 Big Basin Prairie Preserve
 St. Jacob's Well

Education

The community is served by Ashland USD 220 public school district. USD 220 has two schools: Ashland Elementary School and Ashland Junior/Senior High School. The school mascot is the Bluejay and the school colors are royal blue, yellow, and white.

Notable people
 Ronald Johnson, (1935–1998), American poet.
 Wes Santee, (1932–2010), American middle distance runner

References

Further reading

External links

 City of Ashland
 Ashland - Directory of Public Officials
 Ashland city map, KDOT

Cities in Kansas
County seats in Kansas
Cities in Clark County, Kansas
1884 establishments in Kansas
Populated places established in 1884